is a Japanese professional wrestler and former mixed martial artist currently signed to the Japanese promotions All Japan Pro Wrestling where he is a former All Asia Tag Team Champion.

Professional wrestling career

Independent circuit (2018–present) 
Omori sometimes wrestles for other promotions in the Japanese independent scene. At K-DOJO Chiba Festival 2019, an event promoted by Kaientai Dojo on May 1, 2019, Omori defeated Tatsuya Hanami.

All Japan Pro Wrestling (2018–present)
Omori made his professional wrestling debut on the second night of the 2018 Real World Tag League from November 17, 2018, where he fell short to Yusuke Okada. On the first night of the AJPW New Year Wars 2021 tour from January 2, Omori participated in a 22-man battle royal won by The Bodyguard and also involving Shigehiro Irie, Takayuki Ueki, Yoshitatsu, Osamu Nishimura and others. On the third night of the AJPW Champions ~ 50th Anniversary Tour  on March 21, 2022, Omori unsuccessfully challenged Hikaru Sato for the AJPW Junior Heavyweight Championship.

During his tenure, Omori competed in various of the promotion's signature events such as the AJPW Junior Tag League, making his first appearance at the 2019 edition where he teamed up with Francesco Akira and scored a total of three points after going against Kagetora and Yosuke♥Santa Maria, Hikaru Sato and Yusuke Okada, Atsushi Maruyama and Black Menso～re, Banana Senga and Tsutomu Oosugi, and Keiichi Sato and Koji Iwamoto. At the 2020 edition of the tournament, he teamed up with his "Enfants Terribles" tag partner Yusuke Kodama to defeat Purple Haze (Izanagi and Masashi Takeda) in the first rounds but falling short to Evolution (Dan Tamura and Hikaru Sato) in the semi-finals. At the 2021 edition, he teamed up again with Kodama, this time under the name of "Total Eclipse" and defeated Takato Nakano and Masato Kamino in the first rounds, Sugi and Raicho in the semi-finals, and Evolution (Dan Tamura and Hikaru Sato) in the finals to win the tournament.

Another event is the World's Strongest Tag Determination League, making his first appearance at the 2021 edition where he teamed up with Jake Lee, placing themselves in the Block A where they scored a total of two points after going against Suwama and Shotaro Ashino, Abdullah Kobayashi and Drew Parker, and Jun Saito and Rei Saito. At the Ōdō Tournament, he made his first appearance at the 2021 edition where he defeated Ruyki Honda in the first rounds but fell short to Ayato Yoshida in the second rounds.

Mixed martial arts record

|Win
|align=center|7–1–2
|Hiryu
|Submission (armbar)
|PFC Yarennoka! 2017
|
|align=center|2
|align=center|1:38
|Japan
|
|-
|Draw
|align=center|7–1–1
|Yamato Nishikawa
|Decision (unanimous)
|PFC Club Fight 3
|
|align=center|3
|align=center|5:00
|Japan
|
|-
|Win
|align=center|6–1–1
|Dekky Decky
|Submission (armbar)
|PFC 18
|
|align=center|1
|align=center|2:28
|Japan
|
|-
|Win
|align=center|5–1–1
|Tomoki
|TKO
|Cracker vs PFC
|
|align=center|1
|align=center|3:09
|Japan
|
|-
|Win
|align=center|4–1–1
|Tomoki
|Submission (armbar)
|PFC 17
|
|align=center|1
|align=center|4:18
|Japan
|
|-
|Draw
|align=center|4–1–0
|Yamato Nishikawa
|Decision (unanimous)
|PFC 16
|
|align=center|3
|align=center|5:00
|Japan
|
|-
|Win
|align=center|3–1–0
|Prince
|TKO
|PFC Yarennoka! 2016
|
|align=center|1
|align=center|1:01
|Sapporo, Japan
|
|-
|Win
|align=center|2–1–0
|Ago
|Submission (triangle choke)
|PFC Yarennoka! 2016
|
|align=center|1
|align=center|1:23
|Sapporo, Japan
|
|-
|Win
|align=center|1–1–0
|Gojuryu
|TKO
|PFC 15
|
|align=center|1
|align=center|2:40
|Sapporo, Japan
|
|-
|Loss
|align=center|1–0–0
|Masahiro Shinmyo
|Submission (rear-naked choke)
|D-Spiral Second 10
|
|align=center|2
|align=center|2:28
|Sapporo, Japan
|
|-
|Win
|align=center|0–0–0
|Poncho Musa
|Submission (armbar)
|PFC 14
|
|align=center|1
|align=center|3:36
|Sapporo, Japan
|
|-

Championships and accomplishments
All Japan Pro Wrestling
All Asia Tag Team Championship (1 time) – with Yusuke Kodama
AJPW TV Six-Man Tag Team Championship (1 time) – with Yusuke Kodama and Tajiri
AJPW Junior Tag League (2021) – with Yusuke Kodama

References

1995 births
Living people
People from Ebetsu, Hokkaido
Japanese male professional wrestlers
People from Hokkaido
Japanese male mixed martial artists
All Asia Tag Team Champions